"The Proud One" is a 1966 single written by Bob Gaudio and Bob Crewe and originally performed by Frankie Valli and The Four Seasons, and credited to Valli solo; that version peaked at #68 in the U.S. and #64 in Canada.  Billboard claimed that "the electric sound of Valli is used to perfection in this powerful ballad, stating that the "easy-go dance beat [is] effective."  Cash Box said that it is a "powerhouse" and that "the Valli sound holds the moving, teen-oriented tale of love together and the sweeping arrangement adds a must spin again quality to it."

The Osmonds cover
The Osmonds recorded the song and released it in the spring of 1975. It was their final appearance in the US Top 40, peaking at number 22 on the Billboard Hot 100, and their only number one on the Easy Listening chart, where it spent one week at number one in September 1975.  The song also reached number one in Ireland.

Chart history

Weekly charts

Year-end charts

See also
List of number-one adult contemporary singles of 1975 (U.S.)

References

External links
 

1966 songs
1966 singles
1975 singles
Songs written by Bob Gaudio
Songs written by Bob Crewe
Frankie Valli songs
The Four Seasons (band) songs
The Osmonds songs
Irish Singles Chart number-one singles
Philips Records singles
MGM Records singles